The Indy Challenger, also known as the Rajeev Ram Foundation Indy Challenger, is a professional tennis tournament played on indoor hard courts. Since its founding in 2022 by American professional doubles tennis player Rajeev Ram, it has been organized on the Association of Tennis Professionals (ATP) Challenger Tour and has been held at the Pearson Automotive Tennis Club in Zionsville, Indiana, a suburb north of Indianapolis.

Past finals

Singles

Doubles

References

ATP Challenger Tour
Hard court tennis tournaments
Tennis tournaments in the United States